Alet Cathedral (Cathédrale Notre-Dame d'Alet) was a Roman Catholic church located in the town of Alet-les-Bains in Languedoc, France. The cathedral is in the Gothic architectural tradition.

Cathedral of Our Lady
The Diocese of Alet was one of several bishoprics created in 1317 in the wake of the suppression of the Cathars. In Alet the bishops were also the abbots of the already existing monastery there and the cathedral of Our Lady was built next to the abbey.

In 1577 it was largely destroyed by the Huguenots during the Wars of Religion and was not subsequently rebuilt. The immense Gothic quire was demolished by order of the last bishop, Charles de la Cropte de Chancerac in 1776. The diocese of Alet was not restored after the French Revolution and by the Concordat of 1801 its parishes were added to the Diocese of Carcassonne.

The cathedral's stone ruins remain a spectacular sight.

St. Benedict's Cathedral
As the main cathedral was for so long in ruins, part of the monastic buildings were used as an emergency substitute. These premises were known as St. Benedict's Cathedral (Cathédrale Saint-Benoît d'Alet).

References

External links
 Languedoc Info: Alet Cathedral
  Culture.gouv.fr: Cathedrals of Languedoc-Roussillon
 Pictures of the cathedral

Former cathedrals in France
Churches in Aude
Ruins in Occitania (administrative region)
Monuments historiques of Aude
Roman Catholic cathedrals in France